The Rocco B. Commisso Soccer Stadium is a 3,500 seat soccer-specific stadium located in Inwood, on the northernmost tip of the island of Manhattan, New York City, within the Baker Athletic Complex. The stadium is named in honor of Rocco B. Commisso, former co-captain of Columbia's 1970 varsity soccer team, current owner and Chairman of the New York Cosmos and ACF Fiorentina, and the head of cable television provider Mediacom.

History 
Opened in 1985, it is home to the Columbia Lions men's and women's soccer teams of Columbia University and Old Blue RFC of USA Rugby Club 7s and American Rugby Premiership. 

In September 1997, the stadium hosted a semi-final match of the 1997 U.S. Open Cup between the MetroStars and the Dallas Burn of Major League Soccer. From May to July 2015, the stadium was the part-time home of the New York Red Bulls II of the United Soccer League Championship where they played only one home match. 

In 2016, a new FieldTurf surface was installed at the stadium. In 2017, the University opened the "Bubble at Baker", a heated seasonal air-supported structure. The Bubble encloses the soccer field and provides  of winter practice space for Columbia's sports teams. The Bubble will be inflated each winter from December through March. The stadium is adjacent to Robert K. Kraft Field at Lawrence A. Wien Stadium and the Campbell Sports Center.

Transformation to COVID field hospital
In response to the COVID-19 pandemic in New York City, NewYork-Presbyterian / Columbia University Irving Medical Center turned Robert K. Kraft Field and Columbia Soccer Stadium into a 288-bed field hospital. The field hospital is named for decorated US Navy SEAL Ryan F. Larkin (1987–2017), who served in Iraq and Afghanistan. Kate Kemplin, head nurse of the operation, described Larkin as "exactly the kind of person who would have set up a tent to treat patients, if he were alive today." The care center will be staffed primarily with former US military personnel in conjunction with NewYork-Presbyterian’s frontline staff.

References

External links

 Rocco B. Commisso Soccer Stadium

Columbia Lions soccer
Inwood, Manhattan
College soccer venues in the United States
Multi-purpose stadiums in the United States
Rugby union stadiums in New York City
Soccer venues in New York City
Sports venues in Manhattan
Sports venues completed in 1985
1985 establishments in New York City